Shaw House, also known as Cupola House, is a historic home located at Shawboro, Currituck County, North Carolina. It was built about 1885, and is a two-story, three bay by two bay, Italianate style frame dwelling on a brick foundation.  It features a three-story tower and has a two-story rear wing. Also on the property are three contributing outbuildings and a well.

It was listed on the National Register of Historic Places in 1980.

References

Houses on the National Register of Historic Places in North Carolina
Italianate architecture in North Carolina
Houses completed in 1885
Houses in Currituck County, North Carolina
National Register of Historic Places in Currituck County, North Carolina